This article contains information about the literary events and publications of 1694.

Events
August 24 – The Académie française publishes the first complete edition of its Dictionnaire in Paris.
October 25 – Jonathan Swift is ordained a deacon in the Church of Ireland.
December 28 – The death of Queen Mary II of England prompts the writing of numerous elegies.
date unknown – Shortly before his death, Matsuo Bashō completes the writing of Oku no Hosomichi ("Narrow road to the interior"), not published until 1702.

New books

Prose
Edmund Arwaker – An Epistle to Monsieur Boileau
Mary Astell – A Serious Proposal to the Ladies
Thomas Pope Blount – De Re Poetica; or, Remarks upon Poetry
Gilbert Burnet – Four Discourses
Jeremy Collier – Miscellanies
John Dryden and Jacob Tonson – The Annual Miscellany: for the Year 1694
George Fox – The Journal of George Fox, edited by Thomas Ellwood
Charles Gildon – Chorus Poetarum; or, Poems on Several Occasions (incl. Aphra Behn, John Denham, George Etheridge, Andrew Marvell, inter al.)
William Killigrew – Mid-night and Daily Thoughts
William King – Account of Denmark
Jane Lead – The Enochian Walks with God
Jan Luyken – Het Menselyk Bedryf ("The Book of Trades")
John Milton – Letters of State (trans. Edward Phillips)
John Strype – Memorials of Thomas Cranmer
Matthew Tindal – An Essay Concerning the Laws of Nature and the Rights of Soveraigns
William Wotton – Reflections upon Ancient and Modern Learning (answering Sir William Temple)
James Wright – Country Conversations

Drama
John Banks – The Innocent Usurper; or, The Death of the Lady Jane Grey published
Roger Boyle, 1st Earl of Orrery – Herod the Great published
William Congreve – The Double Dealer published
John Crowne – The Married Beau
John Dryden – Love Triumphant; or, Nature Will Prevail
Thomas D'Urfey – The Comical History of Don Quixote (some songs by Henry Purcell)
Laurence Echard, translator:
Plautus's Comedies: Amphytrion, Epidicus, and Rudens
Terence's Comedies
Edward Ravenscroft – The Canterbury Guests
Elkanah Settle – The Ambitious Slave
Thomas Southerne – The Fatal Marriage (adapted from Aphra Behn's The Nun)
Joseph Williams – Have at All, or the Midnight Adventures

Poetry
See 1694 in poetry

Births
August 8 – Francis Hutcheson, Irish philosopher (died 1746)
September 22 – Philip Stanhope, 4th Earl of Chesterfield, English man of letters (died 1773)
October 9 – Marquard Herrgott, German Benedictine historian (died 1762)
November 1 – Voltaire, French philosopher and writer (died 1778)
December 22 – Hermann Samuel Reimarus, German philosopher (died 1768)
probable 
Mademoiselle Aïssé, French letter-writer (died 1733)
James Bramston, English satirical poet (died 1743)

Deaths
August 6 – Antoine Arnauld, French theologian and philosopher (born 1612)
September – Henry Neville, English satirist (born 1620)
October 13 – Samuel von Pufendorf, German philosopher and historian (born 1632)
November 8 – Ulrik Huber, Dutch-born German political philosopher (born 1636)
November 28 – Matsuo Bashō (松尾 芭蕉), Japanese poet (born 1644)
December 9 – Paolo Segneri, Italian ascetic writer (born 1624)

References

 
Years of the 17th century in literature